Glycomyces tarimensis is a bacterium from the genus of Glycomyces which has been isolated from saline-alkali soil from Kalpin County in China.

References 

Actinomycetia
Bacteria described in 2015